Cockermouth Castle is in the town of Cockermouth in Cumbria on a site by the junction of the Rivers Cocker and Derwent. It is a grade I listed building and a Scheduled Ancient Monument.

History
The first castle on this site was built by the Normans in 1134. Some of the stone was sourced from the Roman site of Derventio (now Papcastle). Significant additions were made in the 13th and 14th centuries.  The castle played a significant role in the Wars of the Roses, and in the Civil War, when it was badly damaged.

Various magnates held the castle, most prominently the Percy Earls of Northumberland from the 15th to 17th centuries. It passed to the Wyndham family, the current owners, in the 18th century.

The castle was the home of the dowager Lady Egremont until her death in 2013.

Conservation and public access

Cockermouth Castle was one of 135 sites from North West England included on the Heritage at Risk Register, maintained by English Heritage and later Historic England. The entry noted that the "Majority of Castle in good repair. The C13 Bell Tower is badly leaning and potentially dangerous. The C14 Kitchen Tower is suffering from water ingress". The conservation situation was exacerbated in December 2015, when northern England experienced historically heavy rainfall triggering flooding. The flood defences at Cockermouth were overwhelmed, and the weather caused a landslide near the castle, with the river washing away part its bank; Historic England noted that there was a clear risk to the historic structure. The riverbank was reinforced by a permanent solution has yet to be agreed as of 2022.

The castle has been opened to the public as part of the Heritage Open Days scheme.

See also 

 Grade I listed buildings in Cumbria
 Listed buildings in Cockermouth
 Castles in Great Britain and Ireland
 List of castles in England

References

External links

Fry, Plantagenet Somerset, The David & Charles Book of Castles, David & Charles, 1980. 

Castles in Cumbria
Enclosure castles
Grade I listed buildings in Cumbria
Grade I listed castles
Scheduled monuments in Cumbria
Ruins in Cumbria
Wyndham family residences
Cockermouth